The 2013 Appalachian State Mountaineers football team represented Appalachian State University in the 2013 NCAA Division I FCS football season. They were led by first-year head coach Scott Satterfield and played their home games at Kidd Brewer Stadium. They were a member of the Southern Conference. They finished the season 4–8, 4–4 in SoCon play to finish in a four way tie for fourth place. This was their last season in the SoCon and in the FCS as they moved to FBS and the Sun Belt Conference in 2014. They would be ineligible for the playoffs.

Schedule

Schedule source:

Rankings

*Ineligible for FCS Coaches Poll 
 TSN Poll

References

Appalachian State
Appalachian State Mountaineers football seasons
Appalachian State Mountaineers football